Ledru-Rollin Avenue is a street situated in the neighbourhoods of Quinze-Vingts of the 12th arrondissement and Sainte-Marguerite and Roquette of the 11th arrondissement of Paris.

Location
Ledru-Rollin Avenue is a broad thoroughfare of about 1.5 kilometres in length which unites the Austerlitz Bridge to the Town Hall of the 11th arrondissement, at Leon Blum Square (Place Léon Blum). Its initial orientation is North-East, but Ledru-Rollin Avenue eventually curves towards the North. The entire boulevard is bordered by trees on both sides, and it passes through the three main east-west arteries of the 12th arrondissement: Avenue Daumesnil, the rue de Charenton and the rue du Faubourg-Saint-Antoine, the last of which marks the border between the 12th and the 11th arrondissements. Most of the buildings on the avenue date from the 19th and 20th centuries, and some of them are quite distinguished.

Ledru-Rollin Avenue is easily accessed via the Métro stations Quai de la Rapée, Ledru-Rollin, and Voltaire. It is also close to the stations Bastille and Gare de Lyon on Metro Line , and is home to many bus stops as well, including the 20, 24, 57, 61, 63, and 65 as well as the 69, 76 & 86.

Origin of the name
In 1879, the avenue was named in honour of the French lawyer and politician Alexandre Auguste Ledru, also known as Ledru-Rollin (1807-1874), Minister of the Interior of the 2nd Republic, and a champion of universal suffrage (for men).  Twenty-six other French cities and towns also bear streets with the name Ledru-Rollin: a boulevard in Montpellier, and streets in Agen, Dijon, Avignon, Châteauroux, Tours, Tarbes, Bellac, Argenton-sur-Creuse, Limoges, Marseille, La Ciotat, Moulins, Pertuis, Hellemmes, Reims, Roanne, Rueil-Malmaison, Suresnes, Mauguio, Rochefort-sur-Mer, Sotteville-lès-Rouen, Houilles, Choisy-le-Roi, Ivry-sur-Seine, and in Fontenay-aux-Roses, where he died on 31 December 1874.

History

A part of Ledru-Rollin Avenue was inundated in the famous flooding of the Seine River in January 1910.

Notable buildings
 The beginning of the Austerlitz Bridge.
 No. 33, the technical secondary school Chennevière-Malézieux.
 No. 40, the sculptures on the facade are by Émile Joseph Nestor Carlier (1849-1927).
 At the intersection with Avenue Daumesnil, the high line called Promenade plantée, developed in the late 1990s from a disused train bridge.
 No. 66, the primary entrance to the parish church St. Antoine des XV-XX.

 At No. 153, a former Protestant church, built in 1882 by W. Hansen, is notable for the sculpture of an open Bible.  This building is listed on the protected buildings of the 11th arrondissement.
 At No. 160, the pastry shop La Couronne du Roi, is located, which specialises in cake design.

References

Streets in the 11th arrondissement of Paris
Streets in the 12th arrondissement of Paris